Picnic Island is a small, privately owned, rocky island, with an area of about one hectare, part of the Schouten Island Group, lying close to the eastern coast of Tasmania near the Freycinet Peninsula.  It is composed of sandstone overlying granite.

Picnic Island was put up for sale in 2010 with an asking price of A$500,000 – A$1 million after the property developer vendor had bought it in 2005 for A$65,000.

In November 2020, travel restrictions due to the COVID-19 pandemic had been a "big hit" to the island's accommodation business, which the operator said would normally be about half from the Melbourne market and a quarter each from Sydney and Brisbane. Discounts were offered to local Tasmanians to keep the business going.

Fauna
Recorded breeding seabird species are little penguin and short-tailed shearwater.  The spotted skink is present.

References

External links

Islands of South East Tasmania
Private islands of Tasmania